York is an unincorporated community in Sandusky County, in the U.S. state of Ohio.

History
Former variant names of York were York Station and Townsend. The railroad was extended to York Station in 1853. A post office called Townsend was established in 1828, and remained in operation until 1905.

References

Unincorporated communities in Sandusky County, Ohio
Unincorporated communities in Ohio